The Bureau of Standards, Metrology and Inspection (BSMI) is the administrative agency of the Ministry of Economic Affairs  responsible for standardization, metrology and product inspection in Taiwan.

Branch offices

 Keelung Branch
 Hsinchu Branch
 Taichung Branch
 Tainan Branch
 Kaohsiung Branch
 Hualien Branch

Institutions
 National Standards Review Council
 Information and Communication National Standard Promotion Committee
 National Standards Technology Committees
 Electronic Information Exchange Committee

Transportation
The BSMI headquarter office is accessible within walking distance North East from National Taiwan University Hospital Station of Taipei Metro.

See also
Ministry of Economic Affairs (Taiwan)

References

External links

 

Executive Yuan